The Alabama River, in the U.S. state of Alabama, is formed by the Tallapoosa and Coosa rivers, which unite about  north of Montgomery, near the town of Wetumpka.

Description
The run of the Alabama is highly meandering.

The river crosses the richest agricultural and timber districts of the state.  Railways connect it with the mineral regions of north-central Alabama.

The channel of the river has been considerably improved by the federal government.

The Alabama is navigable throughout the year.

The river played an important role in the growth of the economy in the region during the 19th century as a source of transportation of goods, which included slaves. The river is still used for transportation of farming produce; however, it is not as important as it once was due to the construction of roads and railways.

Documented by Europeans first in 1701, the Alabama, Coosa, and Tallapoosa rivers were central to the homeland of the Creek Indians before their removal by United States forces to the Indian Territory in the 1830s.

Lock and dams
The Alabama River has three lock and dams between Montgomery and the Mobile River.  The Robert F. Henry Lock & Dam is located at river mile 236.2, the Millers Ferry Lock & Dam is located at river mile 133.0, and the Claiborne Lock & Dam is located at river mile 72.5.

Gallery

See also
List of Alabama rivers
Tallapoosa River
Coosa River
Mobile River
 South Atlantic-Gulf Water Resource Region

References

External links

Allrefer.com

 
Alabama placenames of Native American origin
Rivers of Autauga County, Alabama
Rivers of Monroe County, Alabama
Rivers of Montgomery County, Alabama
Rivers of Wilcox County, Alabama
Rivers of Dallas County, Alabama
Rivers of Mobile County, Alabama
Rivers of Elmore County, Alabama
Rivers of Alabama